The Kaziranga Elephant Festival is a yearly elephant festival held in the Kaziranga National Park of Assam for the conservation and protection of Asiatic elephant. The festival is jointly organised by the Forest Department and Tourism Department of Assam with an objective to highlight and find ways to resolve the increasing man-elephant conflict. Hundreds of domestic Asiatic elephants, decorated from head to toe, participate in the program. They take part in parade, races, football and dance earning praises from the spectators.

See also
Mela Shikar
Kaziranga National Park

References

Festivals in Assam
Elephants in Indian culture
Festivals established in 2002
2002 establishments in Assam
Elephant festivals